The 2006–07 Taça de Portugal was the 67th edition of the Portuguese football knockout tournament, organized by the Portuguese Football Federation (FPF). The 2006–07 Taça de Portugal began on 3 September 2006. The final was played on 27 May 2007 at the Estádio Nacional.

Porto were the previous holders, having defeated Vitória de Setúbal 1–0  in the previous season's final. Porto was not able to regain their title as they were defeated by Atlético CP in the fourth round. Sporting CP defeated Belenenses 1–0 in the final to win their 14th Taça de Portugal. By winning the Taça de Portugal, Sporting CP qualified for the 2007 Supertaça Cândido de Oliveira.

Format and schedule

  One Hundred and three of the one hundred and four teams who participated in the 2006–07 Terceira Divisão, played in this round. Vitória Setúbal B was unable to compete in the domestic cup competition due to the possibility of encountering their senior side in the competition. Queluz also did not participate.
  Fifty four of the fifty six teams who participated in the 2006–07 Segunda Divisão, played in this round. Marítimo B was unable to compete in the domestic cup competition due to the possibility of encountering their senior side in the competition. Queluz also did not participate.

Teams

Primeira Liga

 Académica de Coimbra
 Beira-Mar
 Belenenses
 Benfica
 Boavista
 Braga
 Desportivo das Aves
 Estrela da Amadora

 Marítimo
 Nacional
 Naval
 Paços de Ferreira
 Porto
 Sporting CP
 União de Leiria
 Vitória de Setúbal

Liga de Honra

 Chaves
 Estoril
 Feirense
 Gil Vicente
 Gondomar
 Leixões
 Olhanense
 Olivais e Moscavide

 Penafiel
 Portimonense
 Rio Ave
 Santa Clara
 Trofense
 Varzim
 Vitória de Guimarães
 Vizela

Second Division
Série A

 Bragança
 Fafe
 Famalicão
 Freamunde
 Lixa
 Lousada
 Maia

 Maria da Fonte
 Moreirense
 Pontassolense
 Ribeira Brava
 Ribeirão
 Vila Meã

Série B

 Camacha
 Dragões Sandinenses
 Esmoriz
 Fiães
 Infesta
 Lourosa
 Machico

 Marco
 Oliveirense
 Paredes
 Portosantense
 Sporting de Espinho
 União da Madeira
 União de Lamas

Série C

 Avanca
 Fátima
 Lusitânia
 Madalena
 Mirandense
 Nelas
 Oliveira do Bairro

 Operário
 Pampilhosa
 Penalva do Castelo
 Portomosense
 Sporting da Covilhã
 Sporting de Pombal
 Tourizense

Série D

 Abrantes
 Atlético CP
 Barreirense
 Eléctrico
 Estrela de Vendas Novas
 Imortal
 Louletano

 Mafra
 Messinense
 Odivelas
 Pinhalnovense
 Rio Maior
 Torreense

Third Division
Série A

 Amares
 Brito
 Cabeceirense
 Cerveira
 Joane
 Limianos
 Macedo de Cavaleiros
 Marinhas

 Merelinense
 Mirandela
 Mondinense
 União Torcatense
 Valdevez
 Vianense
 Vilaverdense
 Vieira

Série B

 AD Oliveirense
 Aliados Lordelo
 Alijoense
 Amarante
 Ataense
 Canedo
 Ermesinde
 Leça

 Oliveira do Douro
 Pedras Rubras
 Rebordosa
 São Pedro da Cova
 Tirsense
 Torre de Moncorvo
 Vila Real
 Vilanovense

Série C

 AD Valonguense
 Águeda
 Anadia
 Gafanha
 Milheiroense
 Oliveira do Hospital
 Paços de Brandão
 Sanjoanense

 Santacombadense
 São João de Ver
 Sátão
 Social Lamas
 Tocha
 Tondela
 Valecambrense

Série D

 Alcobaça
 Atlético Riachense
 Benfica Castelo Branco
 Bidoeirense
 Bombarralense
 Caldas
 Caranguejeira
 Gândara

 Idanhense
 Marinhense
 Monsanto
 Penamacorense
 Peniche
 Sertanense
 Sourense
 União de Coimbra

Série E

 1º de Dezembro
 Alcochetense
 Atlético do Cacém
 Atlético Povoense 
 Câmara de Lobos
 Caniçal
 Cartaxo
 Carregado

 Casa Pia
 Lourel
 Montijo
 O Elvas
 Oeiras
 Oriental
 Santana
 Sintrense

Série F

 Almancilense
 Amora
 Atlético do Reguengos
 Beira-Mar de Monte Gordo
 Campinense
 Cova da Piedade
 Desportivo de Beja

 Ferreiras
 Juventude Évora
 Lagoa
 Lusitano de Évora
 Lusitano VRSA
 Serpa
 Silves

Série Azores

 Angrense
 Capelense
 Fayal
 Marítimo Graciosa
 Marítimo Velense

 Praiense
 Santiago
 Santo António
 União Micaelense
 Vitória do Pico

District Leagues

 Aguiar da Beira
 Águias do Moradal
 Armacenenses
 Boavista de São Mateus
 Bougadense
 Canas Senhorim
 Carregosense
 CF Vasco da Gama
 Desportivo de Beja
 Fazendense
 Ferreiras
 Lousanense

 Mãe d'Água
 Monfortense
 Neves
 Oriolenses
 Pedras Salgadas
 Ponterrolense
 Porto Moniz
 Pescadores
 Seia
 Serzedelo
 União da Serra
 União do Nordeste

First round
For the first round draw, teams were drawn against each other in accordance to their geographical location. The draw was split up into four sections: teams from the north, the center, the south and the Azores region. The draw for the first round took place on 8 August. All first round cup ties were played on 3 September. Due to the odd number of teams involved at this stage of the competition, 1º de Dezembro, Canedo, Cartaxo, Lajense, Macedo de Cavaleiros, Penamacorense and União da Serra progressed to the next round. Vasco da Gama AC were scheduled to play Casa Pia, but forfeited their match due to the club folding at the beginning of the 2006–07 season. The first round of the cup saw teams from the Terceira Divisão (IV) start the competition alongside some teams who registered to participate in the cup from the Portuguese District Leagues (V).

North Zone

|}

Central Zone

|}

South Zone

|}

Azores Zone

|}

Second round
The draw for the second round took place on 11 September. All second round ties were played on 24 September. Due to the odd number of teams at this stage of the competition, Avanca, Bougadense, Imortal, Louletano, Maria da Fonte, Marítimo Graciosa, Oliveira do Bairro, Paços de Brandão, Paredes and Tourizense progressed to the next round. The second round saw teams from the Portuguese Second Division (III) enter the competition.

Série A

|}

Série B

|}

Série C

|}

Série D

|}

Third round
The draw for the third round took place on 30 October. The majority of the third round ties were played on 11 November. Due to the odd number of teams in the competition, Casa Pia progressed to the next round due to having no opponent to face at this stage of the competition. The third round saw teams from the Liga de Honra (II) enter the competition.

|}

Fourth round
The draw for the fourth round took place on 28 November. Sporting CP's cup tie against União da Madeira was played on 21 December, whilst Benfica's tie against Oliveira do Bairro was played on 6 January. The remainder of the ties were played on 7 January. Due to the odd number of teams in the competition, Rio Ave progressed to the next round due to having no opponent to face at this stage of the competition. The fourth round saw teams from the Primeira Liga (I) enter the competition.

|}

Fifth round
The draw for the fourth round took place on 9 January. All of the cup ties were played on 21 January. Due to the odd number of participants in the competition, Bragança progressed to the next round due to having no opponent to face at this stage of the competition.

Sixth round
Ties were played on 10 February. Due to the odd number of participants involved in the 2006–07 Taça de Portugal, Braga qualified for the quarter finals due to having no opponent to face at this stage of the competition.

Quarter-finals
Three of the cup ties were played on 28 February, whilst Braga's game against Varzim was played on 25 March.

Semi-finals
Ties were played on 18–19 April. All four semi-finalists were from the Primeira Liga.

Final

References

Taça de Portugal seasons
Taca De Portugal, 2006-07
2006–07 domestic association football cups